Kenya competed at the 2019 African Games held from 19 to 31 August 2019 in Rabat, Morocco. In total, 290 athletes were scheduled to represent Kenya at 12th edition of the African Games. This later dropped to 259 athletes. Athletes representing Kenya won 11 gold medals, 10 silver medals and 10 bronze medals and the country finished 7th in the medal table.

Medal summary

Medal table

3x3 basketball 

Kenya competed in both the men's and women's tournaments.

The men's team lost all their matches in the group phase and did not advance to the semi-finals.

The women's team finished in 4th place.

Archery 

Kenya competed in archery. Sayed Mohamed Akeel, Shehzana Anwar and Diramu Golicha Elema competed in several archery events.

Athletics 

In total 61 athletes competed in athletics. Beatrice Chepkoech, Paul Tanui and Julius Yego are among the athletes to represent Kenya in athletics at the 2019 African Games. Hyvin Kiyeng, Conseslus Kipruto, Benjamin Kigen and Joash Kiplimo were scheduled to compete.

Titus Ekiru won the men's half marathon with a time of 1:01:42. He became the first Kenyan to win this event at the African Games. This was also a new African Games record.

Badminton 

Kenya competed in badminton with 8 players.

Boxing 

Ethan Maina, Boniface Mugunde, Nick Okoth, Boniface Mugunde, George Kosby, Veronica Mbithe and Elizabeth Akinyi were among the boxers to represent Kenya at the 2019 African Games. Lorna Kusa also represented Kenya in boxing.

Chess 

Kenya competed in chess. Mehul Manilal Gohil, Mongeli Maingi, Joyce Nyaruai Ndirangu and Ricky Kipng'etich Sang were scheduled to compete in chess.

Cycling 

Kenya competed in both mountain bike cycling and road cycling.

Nancy Akinyi Debe won one of the two bronze medals in the women's cross-country marathon event. Fatima Zahraa El Hayani representing Morocco also won a bronze medal in this event as both cyclists finished with a time of 2:29:58.520.

Handball 

Kenya competed in the women's handball tournament. The women's team lost all their matches and did not advance to the quarter finals.

Judo 

18 athletes represented Kenya in judo. Among these are: Esther Ikiugu, Carlos Ochieng, Evans Omondi, Kimberly Okwisa, Peterson Gathiru, Lydia Wangui, Mathew Mutinda, Alice Lokale, Isaac Muyale, and Diana Kana.

Karate 

Kenya competed in karate.

Rowing 

Five rowers represented Kenya in rowing.

Paluwas Ramadhani competed in the men's single sculls 500 metres event.

Diana Natecho competed in the women's single sculls 500 metres event.

Alex Osiako competed in the men's lightweight single sculls 500 metres event.

Josephine Wangithi competed in the women's lightweight single sculls 500 metres event.

Diana Natecho and Suleiman Ramdhani competed in the mixed 2 × 500 metres single sculls event.

Shooting 

Two athletes represented Kenya in shooting (in the men's trap and men's skeet events).

Matharu Jaspal Singh competed in the men's trap and the men's skeet event.

Dhruv Rajesh Shah competed in the men's skeet event.

Swimming 

Kenya competed in swimming. Eight swimmers were scheduled to compete: Maria Chantal Brunlehner, Rebecca Wacui Kamau, Maahir Abdulkadir Mohamed Marunani, Issa Abdulla Mohamed, Ridhwan Abubakar Bwana Mohamed, Emily Siobhan Muteti, Samuel Kariuki Ndonga and Swaleh Abubakar Talib.

Kenyan swimmers won the bronze medal in the women's 4 × 100 metre medley relay event.

Table tennis 

Kenya competed in table tennis.

Taekwondo 

Faith Wanjiku Ogallo won the silver medal in the women's +73 kg event.

Everlyne Aluocheolod won a bronze medal in the women's –73 kg event.

Tennis 

Kenya competed in tennis.

Triathlon 

Kenyan athletes competed in the men's, the women's event and the mixed relay event.

Volleyball 

Both Kenya's men's team and women's team competed at the 2019 African Games. The women's team won the gold medal in the women's tournament.

Kenya also won the silver medal in the women's beach volleyball tournament.

Weightlifting 

Kenya competed in weightlifting.

Wrestling 

Kenya competed in wrestling. No medals were won.

References 

Nations at the 2019 African Games
2019
African Games